Vilnis ('The Wave') was a Lithuanian-language Bolshevik newspaper published from Riga 1913-1914 (weekly) and in 1917, issued by a group of Lithuanian socialists residing there. Vilnis was brought from Riga for distribution inside Lithuania.

References

Socialist newspapers
Lithuanian-language newspapers
Newspapers established in 1913
Publications disestablished in 1914
Mass media in Riga
1913 establishments in the Russian Empire
1914 disestablishments in the Russian Empire
Defunct weekly newspapers
Newspapers published in the Russian Empire